In enzymology, an isonocardicin synthase is an enzyme that catalyzes the chemical reaction

S-adenosyl-L-methionine + nocardicin E  5'-methylthioadenosine + isonocardicin A

Thus, the two substrates of this enzyme are S-adenosyl-L-methionine and nocardicin E, whereas its two products are 5'-methylthioadenosine and isonocardicin A.

This enzyme belongs to the family of transferases, specifically those transferring aryl or alkyl groups other than methyl groups.  The systematic name of this enzyme class is S-adenosyl-L-methionine:nocardicin-E 3-amino-3-carboxypropyltransferase. This enzyme is also called nocardicin aminocarboxypropyltransferase.

References

 

EC 2.5.1
Enzymes of unknown structure